The ASW Handicap Chase was a National Hunt handicap chase in England which was open to horses aged five years and older.

It was run at Cheltenham over a distance of 4 miles and 1 furlong (6,637 metres), and was scheduled to take place each year on New Year's Day.

The race was first run in 1953 as the Fred Withington Handicap Chase, and was last run in 2004.  

From 1975 the race was sponsored by Bass and then later by Food Brokers Ltd and Intasun.  

From 1998 the race was known as the Miles Gosling Handicap, after a previous chairman of Cheltenham Racecourse who died in 1997, aged 69.

Winners

See also
Horse racing in Great Britain
List of British National Hunt races

References

Racing Post:

National Hunt chases
National Hunt races in Great Britain
Cheltenham Racecourse
Discontinued horse races
Recurring sporting events established in 1953
1953 establishments in England
2004 disestablishments in England
Recurring sporting events disestablished in 2004